Pete Cashmore (born 18 September 1985) is the founder and former CEO of the media and entertainment company Mashable, He grew up in Banchory, Aberdeenshire, Scotland, and founded Mashable in Aberdeenshire in 2005 when he was 19.

Biography
In 2009, Cashmore was recognized in Inc.'s "30 Under 30", Forbes' "Top 25 Web Celebs", and The Huffington Post's "Top 10 Game Changers 2009". 

Cashmore previously wrote a weekly column on technology and social media for CNN. In 2012, Cashmore made Time magazine's list of the 100 most influential people.

In 2017, Mashable was sold to Ziff Davis for 50 million dollars, and over 50 staff members were laid off.

In November 2018, after his social media profiles were edited to include "Now: Taking some time off and working on something new," it was announced that Cashmore would be leaving Mashable at the end of the year. The general manager of Ziff Davis Tech (Mashable's parent company), Mike Finnerty, confirmed this.

In November 2022, Cashmore launched Masterverse.io, a cryptocurrency, NFT, and Web3 related website.

References

External links

1985 births
Living people
People educated at Banchory Academy
People from Banchory
Scottish bloggers
Scottish businesspeople
Place of birth missing (living people)
Scottish expatriates in the United States
Scottish columnists
British technology writers